Córdoba is a town and municipality in the Nariño Department of Colombia.

References

Municipalities of Nariño Department